Anthene ituria is a butterfly in the family Lycaenidae. It is found in the Democratic Republic of the Congo (Mongala, Uele, Ituri, North Kivu, Tshopo, Equateur, Sankuru and Maniema) and Uganda.

References

Butterflies described in 1910
Anthene